The Voer (Dutch,) is a small river in Belgium and the Netherlands. It is a right-bank tributary to the river Meuse. It has three (creek-) tributaries of its own: the Veurs, the Noor and the Beek.

The source of the Voer is near the village of Sint-Pieters-Voeren in the Belgian province of Limburg. The river crosses the Belgian-Dutch border between 's-Gravenvoeren and Mesch, and flows into the river Meuse at Eijsden. It lends its name to the Voeren municipality as well as to the villages 's-Gravenvoeren, Sint-Pieters-Voeren and Sint-Martens-Voeren through which it passes.

References

International rivers of Europe
Rivers of Belgium
Rivers of the Netherlands
Rivers of Limburg (Belgium)
Rivers of South Limburg (Netherlands)
Eijsden-Margraten
Voeren